Karl or Carl Jones may refer to:

Carl G. Jones (born 1954), Welsh biologist and conservationist
Karl Jones (born 1957), Welsh racing driver
Carl Jones (footballer) (born 1986), English defender
Carl Jones (basketball) (born 1991), American point guard